The Ankara 19 Mayıs Stadium was the home venue of Ankara's Gençlerbirliği. It was built in 1930 and is part of the 19 Mayıs Sports Complex, which is located in the Ulus district. The stadium had a capacity of 19,209 (all-seater). Ankaraspor also used the stadium until they moved to their new venue in the Yenikent district.

The stadium was named after the date May 19, 1919, when Mustafa Kemal Atatürk arrived at Samsun to start the Turkish War of Independence. Official ceremonies to celebrate the May 19th Youth and Sports Day were also held at the stadium.

In August 2018, demolition of the stadium began in order to make way for a new stadium to be built on the site.

Original stadium

The stadium was originally built from 1934 to 1936, designed by architect Paolo Vietti-Violi.

Stadium reconstruction project
The New Ankara 19 Mayıs Stadium, is a newly reconstruction project by GSGM and the Ankara City Council. The stadium's project was introduced to the Turkish press on February 4, 2010. It will have a seating capacity for 20.600 spectators and will be totally covered.

The New Ankara Stadium will be located on the site of the current stadium. With a newly completed basketball arena to its west and the Youth Park to its south, the new stadium constitutes a promising urban sports and recreation centre.

The stadium is situated at a most convenient location; minutes away from the historic city centre and railway station on foot, and accessible easily by various highways, as well as two different metro lines and several bus routes.

The stadium appears as a distorted cube, fitting in very well with its urban surrounding both aesthetically and functionally. It will be completed by a façade with a structure consisting of geometric patterns inspired by traditional Turkish mosaic art and architecture.

Stands 

In the currently used stadium there are five stands: Gecekondu, Maraton, Saatli, Kapalı and Protokol. Gecekondu, Maraton and Kapalı are usually used by the home side supporters. Protokol belongs to statesmen and high-level officials from both the home side and the visiting side. Saatli is usually spared for the visiting team's supporters. Gecekondu is the cheapest part of the stadium.

Access 

The stadium can be accessed by car, bus, metro, and dolmuş. Ulus Metro Station has a stop for the stadium.

Matches and tickets 
There are two types of tickets for the clubs playing in this stadium: seasonal and per match. Single match tickets can be purchased online from the Biletix website.

References

External links 
Stadium picture
Official site for EURO 2016 Bid Turkey  
Official site for EURO 2016 Bid Turkey – New Ankara Stadium

Football venues in Turkey
Sports venues in Ankara
Sports venues completed in 1936
Süper Lig venues
Athletics (track and field) venues in Turkey
Sports venues demolished in 2018
Demolished buildings and structures in Turkey